Aleana is a feminine given name, similar to Alanna and Alena.

List of people with the given name 
 Aleana Egan (born 1979), Irish sculptor
 Aleana Young, Canadian politician

Feminine given names
English feminine given names